Araguaçu is a municipality located in the Brazilian state of Tocantins. Its population was 8,467 (2020) and its area is 5,168 km².

References

Municipalities in Tocantins